is a railway station operated by Meitetsu's  Tokoname Line located in Minami Ward, Nagoya, Aichi Prefecture,  Japan. It is located 6.1 rail kilometers from the terminus of the line at Jingū-mae Station.

History
The station was renamed to its present name in 1917. The Aichi Electric Railway became part of the Meitetsu group on August 1, 1935. Express train service was discontinued from 1990. From 2004–2006, the tracks were elevated. On July 1, 2006, the Tranpass system of magnetic fare cards with automatic turnstiles was implemented, and the station has been unattended since that point.

Lines
Meitetsu
Tokoname Line

Layout
Shibata Station has two elevated side platforms.

Platforms

Adjacent stations

Notes

External links
  Meitetsu Station information

Railway stations in Aichi Prefecture
Railway stations in Japan opened in 1912
Stations of Nagoya Railroad